was a Japanese samurai, karō of Chōshū Domain and a prominent economic reformer of the Edo period.

See also 

 Tenpō Reforms

Sources 

 Albert M. Craig: Chōshū in the Meiji restoration, Lexington Books, 2000,

External links 
 Kyoto University Library Ishin Database - wall scroll with poem by Murata Seifu

1783 births
1855 deaths
Samurai
Japanese politicians
People from Yamaguchi Prefecture